Mastixia macrophylla is a species of plant in the Nyssaceae family. It is endemic to Sri Lanka.

References

macrophylla
Endemic flora of Sri Lanka
Vulnerable plants
Taxonomy articles created by Polbot